The National Institute for Environmental Studies (NIES:国立環境研究所, Kokuritsu-Kankyō kenkyūsho) was established in 1974 as a focal point for environmental research in Japan. In 2001 it became an Independent Administrative Institution. 
NIES is organised into eight centers, each of which is subdivided into a further number of sections responsible for different specializations within the broader field to which they belong.
The eight centers are responsible for research in eight different fields, with programs dedicated to these research areas.

History 

July 1971      Environment Agency established

November 1971  NIES Founding Committee established

March 1974     National Institute for Environmental Studies established

April 1985     Emperor Showa visits NIES

July 1990      Restructuring of NIES to include global environmental research

October 1990   Center for Global Environmental Research established

January 2001   Environment Agency becomes Ministry of the Environment. 
Waste Management Division established at NIES

April 2001     NIES established as an incorporated administrative agency.
First five-year plan (2001–2005) commences
List of Independent Administrative Institutions (Japan)

References

External links 
Official web site of NIES

Research institutes in Japan
International research institutes
Organizations established in 2001
Independent Administrative Institutions of Japan
Environmental research institutes
Environmental studies institutions in Japan
2001 establishments in Japan